Philip Jay Berg (February 15, 1902 –  February 1, 1983) was a talent agent who co-founded the Berg-Allenberg talent agency, he was known for his movie package deals.

Biography
Berg was born in New York City on February 15, 1902. He was of Jewish descent. He graduated from the University of Pennsylvania. In 1924, he moved to Los Angeles where he worked as a talent agent, becoming a millionaire by the age of 26. In 1927, he partnered with Bert Allenberg to form the Berg-Allenberg talent agency. Berg created the concept of the "package deal" where he would find a script, a writer, actors, and a director; and then sold the entire package to a producer. He represented such stars as Clark Gable, Judy Garland, Joan Crawford, Lucille Ball, Wallace Beery, Walter Brennan, Olivia de Havilland, Melvyn Douglas, Walter Huston, Buster Keaton, Alan Ladd, Charles Laughton, and Edward G. Robinson; directors Frank Capra, Victor Fleming, Vincente Minnelli, Jean Renoir, and William Wellman; and writers Michael Arlen, James Hilton, Dalton Trumbo, and Rodgers and Hart. He served in the U.S. Navy during World War II. He retired in 1947 to pursue his passion in archaeology. In December 1949, the Berg-Allenberg Agency was acquired by the William Morris Agency.

Personal life
In 1927, he married vaudevillian stage performer, model and film actress Leila Hyams who predeceased him. He remarried to Joan Hartley. He left his collection of artifacts and art (valued at $1.5 million in 1969) to the Los Angeles County Museum of Art.

References

1902 births
1983 deaths
American people of Jewish descent
American talent agents
Place of death missing